Kscope is an independent record label that is part of Snapper Music, and a sister-label of Peaceville. It is dedicated to artists in the progressive rock genre. The label has released albums by Steven Wilson and his projects Porcupine Tree (mostly re-issue only), No-Man and Blackfield. In 2008 it branched out and has since signed the post-progressive artists Anathema, Lunatic Soul and Ulver, and progressive rock stalwart Ian Anderson to their roster. In 2013, the Steven Wilson release The Raven That Refused to Sing (and Other Stories) received the Album of the Year award at the Progressive Music Awards.

History 
Established in the late 1990s, the label was initially used exclusively by Wilson and Porcupine Tree. In this first incarnation, Kscope was featured as an outlet for the 1999 album Stupid Dream, with Snapper Music as the distributor. It was followed by Lightbulb Sun in 2000 and a collection of left-over material Recordings. After the band signed up with Atlantic Records in 2002, the name was used for Wilson's side projects. This included the albums Together We're Stranger (2003) and the re-issue of the Flowermouth (2005) by No-Man. It also released Blackfield (2004) and Blackfield II (2007)—a collaboration with Aviv Geffen.

When Snapper Music acquired the earlier Porcupine Tree recordings from Delerium Records in 2006, a re-release programme was rolled out. At the same time, talks began to expand the remit of the label, and Wilson suggested to "have [it] for releasing only new music. Just go after some of these [post progressive] bands and model yourselves on those old ’70s labels, like Harvest and Vertigo, [who] would allow artists to develop both musically and with a fan base over a period of albums”. As a result, Snapper music remodeled Kscope to focus on post-progressive music, with Wilson actively involved with the acts that were signed.

One of the label's earliest signings was The Pineapple Thief after its frontman Bruce Soord was contacted by Wilson. The first release was the Tightly Unwound album that received the catalogue number 101. Within two years Kscope built up its roster with Johnny Wilks commenting that by this stage "the label had really got going and we were working with Engineers, Gazpacho & Steven Wilson. I really felt we were establishing ourselves as a label". At the same time, Kscope continued to release Wilson related material, including Schoolyard Ghosts by No-Man on 12 May 2008. A number of re-releases included the first solo album, Things Buried, by Richard Barbieri in 2007. In 2008 the band Anathema made their debut on the label with album Hindsight, while Lunatic Soul from Poland and the Italian band Nosound were added to the roster.

The label packages their albums in elaborate digibooks, super jewelcases or digipacks with additional DVD material. Like the Steven Wilson solo album Insurgentes (2009) that was included a documentary and a DVD-Audio option. Another prominent release was We’re Here Because We’re Here by Anathema.

In 2013, the label celebrated its fifth anniversary with two concerts in London, headlined by Amplifier and Anathema. In April 2014 the label released the Homo Erraticus album by Ian Anderson, which reached #14 in the UK album chart.

Kscope have a monthly podcast hosted by Billy Reeves, which features new music and interviews from artists on the label.

Signed artists 
 Amplifier
 Anathema
 The Anchoress 
 Ian Anderson
 Anekdoten
 Richard Barbieri
 Blackfield
 Paul Draper
 Engineers
 Envy of None
 Henry Fool
 Gavin Harrison & 05Ric
 Gazpacho
 Godsticks
 Steve Hogarth
 Iamthemorning
 Steve Jansen
 Katatonia
 Leafblade
 Lunatic Soul
 Mick Karn
 Mothlite
 No-Man
 Nordic Giants
 North Atlantic Oscillation
 Nosound
 Old Fire (John Mark Lapham)
 Ozric Tentacles
 Paul Draper
 Porcupine Tree (1999–2001)
 Se Delan
 Sweet Billy Pilgrim
 The Receiver
 Tangerine Dream
 TesseracT
 The Pineapple Thief (including Bruce Soord (solo) and Wisdom of Crowds)
 Ulver
 White Moth Black Butterfly
 Steven Wilson (2009-2016)

See also
 List of record labels

References

External links
 Official Kscope site
 Official Snapper Music site

British independent record labels
Progressive rock record labels